Danger Zone is the debut EP by the American hardcore punk band China White.

A longer early version of the title track, "Dangerzone", recorded in June 1980, would be later released as "Danger Zone" on the 1983 New Underground Records compilation album Life Is Beautiful So Why Not Eat Health Foods?

Production and release
Record producer by Mike Patton and Thom Wilson, Danger Zone was recorded at Redondo Pacific Studios in Redondo Beach, California.

The EP was released by Frontier Records in 1981 on 12-inch vinyl disc..

Cover art
The photo on the front cover, portraying a murder scene, was taken by Southern Californian punk photographer Edward Colver.

The band members photographs on the back cover were taken by Glen E. Friedman, another American photographer.

Critical reception
Charles P. Lamey of Trouser Press was of the view that:

Reissues
In 1996, Danger Zone was re-released on a split CD shared with the Flyboys' self-titled EP from 1980.

In 2013, Frontier, in collaboration with Burger Records, reissued the original EP as a 300-copy limited edition, hand-numbered cassette.

Track listing

Personnel
China White
 Marc Martin (name misspelled as Mark) – vocals
 Frank Ruffino (surname misspelled as Raffino) – guitar
 James Rodriguez – bass
 Joey Ruffino (surname misspelled as Raffino) – drums

Production
 Mike Patton – Record producer
 Thom Wilson – production
 Diane Zincavage – graphic design
 Edward C. Colver – photography (front cover)
 Glen E. Friedman – photography (back cover)

Notes

References

External links
 Danger Zone. Frontier Records.
 Danger Zone. Discogs.
 Danger Zone / Flyboys. Discogs.

1981 debut EPs
China White (band) albums